Mattoon may refer to:

Places
Mattoon, Illinois
Mattoon station, Illinois
Mattoon, Kentucky
Mattoon, Wisconsin

People
Abner C. Mattoon (1814–1895), New York politician